Felino Jardim (born 10 August 1985) is a Dutch footballer who plays as a midfielder for Nieuw-Lekkerland.

Career
He has previously played for Feyenoord, RKC Waalwijk and Sparta Rotterdam, as well as being capped at under-17 and under-19 level for the Netherlands. Despite this, he managed just a handful of senior appearances including coming on as a substitute in the Eredivisie playoffs for RKC Waalwijk. After being released by Sparta Rotterdam at the end of the 2007–08 season, he had trials in England with Bedford Town, Cambridge United and Barnet before finally signing a one-year deal with Cambridge United on 7 August 2008.

Jardim scored on his debut for Cambridge on 9 August 2008, in a Conference National match away at Northwich Victoria. He was released in February 2009.

In July 2009 he returned to Holland, and signed with RBC Roosendaal. On 28 July 2011, he signed for Conference National club Newport County and he was released by Newport County in July 2012.

Jardim would later play in the lower tiers of Dutch football, most notably five years for Spijkenisse. In June 2020, he moved to Nieuw-Lekkerland in the Eerste Klasse.

References

External links

football profile voetbal international

1985 births
Living people
Footballers from Rotterdam
Dutch footballers
Dutch expatriate footballers
Association football midfielders
Feyenoord players
RKC Waalwijk players
Sparta Rotterdam players
Cambridge United F.C. players
RBC Roosendaal players
Felino Jardim
Newport County A.F.C. players
XerxesDZB players
VV Capelle players
VV Spijkenisse players
Eerste Divisie players
Derde Divisie players
Vierde Divisie players
National League (English football) players
Expatriate footballers in England
Expatriate footballers in Thailand
Dutch expatriate sportspeople in England
Dutch expatriate sportspeople in Thailand
Eerste Klasse players